Molkin is a rural locality (a (khutor)  under the administrative jurisdiction of the Town of Goryachy Klyuch of Krasnodar Krai, Russia. Population:

"Molkino" military range

To the west of the village there is a military training ground called "Molkino", known for its use for preparation of the Russian military and forces of the Donetsk People's Republic and Luhansk People's Republic  for the war against Ukraine. The base is also used as the main training facility for mercenaries of Wagner's PMC.

References

Rural localities in Krasnodar Krai